Tribute Games is an independent video game development studio located in Montreal, Quebec. It was founded on 9 May 2011 by former Ubisoft employees Jonathan Lavigne, Jean-Francois Major and Justin Cyr who, amongst other games, have worked on Scott Pilgrim vs. the World: The Game and TMNT.

Games

Games developed and published

Games developed

Games published

References

External links
Official site
Facebook
Twitter

2011 establishments in Quebec
Video game companies of Canada
Video game development companies
Video game publishers
Companies based in Montreal
Privately held companies of Canada
Canadian companies established in 2011
Video game companies established in 2011
Indie video game developers